Kahuta (Punjabi,) is a census-designated place, city and tehsil in the Rawalpindi District of Punjab, Pakistan. The population of the Kahuta Tehsil is approximately 220,576 at the 2017 census. Kahuta is the home to the Kahuta Research Laboratories (KRL) which was founded to undertake the Kahuta Project as part of the atomic bomb project. Before the Kahuta Project, the site was occupied by retired officers of Pakistan Armed Forces and contained a small public community, including a private high school.

Etymology 
The name "Kahuta" was originated from the name of the tree which is extensively found there. The local name of the tree is "koh". It could also be named after the Kahut tribe which is a prominent tribe in the region and in the surrounding regions also.

History
Kahuta was a small incorporated city until the 1970s when KRL was constructed by the Pakistan Army Corps of Engineers under Engineering officer Major-General Zahid Ali Akbar, Director of Project-706. During the 1960s and 1970s, Kahuta was inhabited by retired officers of the Pakistan Armed Forces.

In the 1970s, the Ministry of Defence was tasked by Prime Minister Zulfikar Ali Bhutto to search for a remote location for carrying out atomic and weapon-testing experiments for the integrated atomic bomb project in 1976. The Uranium Coordination Board (UCB) headed by Ghulam Ishaq Khan financed the reconstruction of the site. Major-General Zahid Ali Akbar and later completed the drawings, surveying and measured the area aerially. Within the week, the whole site was acquired by the Ministry of Defence, and the army truckloads, heavy engineering vehicles arrived the next day to re-built the site.  All incoming materials and research equipment were labeled as common items and engineering tools to conceal the true nature of their purpose. Scientists and engineers working and living in Kahuta were censored by the senior military officials. Soon, the site was classified and abandoned for public with only few allowed to resides. The Engineering Research Laboratories (now KRL) was established by Zulfikar Ali Bhutto as a research government national facility under the Ministry of Defence.

Geography

Kahuta is situated in the Himalayan foothills in Rawalpindi District of Pakistan's Punjab Province, approximately 30 km southeast of Pakistan's capital, Islamabad. There are many picnic spots like Punjpeer Rocks in Narar (Narh), Ling Stream and Badshah Peak in Sore Valley, Kotli Sattian, Azad Pattan, Tlaitar and Beyore Salitha,Nara matore. The area is noted for its wildlife and hunting. The region is also famous for its high mountains and many of the villagers live in the mountains. The Potohari dialect of the Punjabi language is spoken in this region.

References

Populated places in Kahuta Tehsil
Nuclear history of Pakistan
Project-706
History of science and technology in Pakistan
Cities in Rawalpindi District